Elkton High School may refer to:

Elkton High School (Maryland), Elkton, Maryland
Elkton High School (Oregon), Elkton, Oregon
Elkton High School (South Dakota), Elkton, South Dakota